is a passenger railway station located in the city of Gobō, Wakayama Prefecture, Japan, operated by the private Kishū Railway

Lines

Station layout
The station consists of one side platform serving a single bi-directional track. There is no station building, but only a shelter on the platform. The station is unattended.

Adjacent stations

History
Shiyakusho-mae Station opened on August 30, 1967.

Passenger statistics
In fiscal 2019, the station was used by an average of 8 passengers daily (boarding passengers only).

Surrounding Area
 Gobō City Hall
 Gobō Elementary School

See also
List of railway stations in Japan

References

External links

Railway stations in Wakayama Prefecture
Railway stations in Japan opened in 1967
Gobō, Wakayama